UNOSOM (United Nations Operation in Somalia) may refer to:

 UNOSOM I, an operation established in April 1992 and running until its duties were assumed by the UNITAF mission in December 1992
 UNOSOM II, an operation from March 1993 until March 1995
 UNITAF, an operation from December 1992 until May 1993
 Operation Provide Relief (Part of UNITAF)

See also
 Unisom, a brand name of diphenhydramine
 Operation Deliverance, the concurrent Canadian operation